Bob Cunningham may refer to:

Bob Cunningham (Canadian football) (1927–2006), Canadian football fullback
Bob Cunningham (ice hockey) (born 1941), Canadian ice hockey centre
Bob Cunningham (musician) (1934–2017), American jazz double-bassist

See also
Robert Cunningham (disambiguation)